Richard John Joseph Durante (born 17 August 1930 at New Westminster, British Columbia - 11 September 2003) was a Liberal Party member of the House of Commons of Canada. He was a supervising principal by career.

In the 1968 general election, Tom Barnett was initially declared the winner of the Comox—Alberni riding over Durante by a three-vote margin. But the Liberals demanded a recount whose result gave Durante a nine-vote lead, therefore giving Durante the seat in Parliament. However, Barnett and his party's riding association filed a court challenge that concluded on 3 February 1969 when two British Columbia Supreme Court judges ruled that twelve Canadian Forces members had voted despite being ineligible.  The result was therefore invalidated. Durante was allowed to remain a member of the House of Commons for one additional week, to allow time for a possible appeal. The Liberals ultimately decided not to challenge the ruling, and Durante's seat was declared vacant.

This led to a by-election on 8 April 1969 which Barnett won against Durante, therefore cutting short the Liberal candidate's career in federal politics.

References

External links
 

1930 births
2003 deaths
Members of the House of Commons of Canada from British Columbia
Liberal Party of Canada MPs
People from New Westminster